Lux Mundi (Latin for "Light of the World") may refer to:

Lux Mundi (statue), a statue of Jesus by Tom Tsuchiya
Lux Mundi (book), an 1889 collection of 12 essays by liberal Anglo-Catholic theologians
Lux Mundi (album), a 2011 album by the heavy metal band Samael
Wessel Gansfort (1419–1489), humanist of the 15th century who was widely known as Lux Mundi 

Lux Mundi (band), an American drum & bass band and production duo

Lux Mundi ( Jesus Christ) .... , In Bible Book of John Chapter 8:12, Jesus Christ spoke of himself as the Light of the World. Same was equated unto the followers of Christ ( Believers) in the Bible Book of Matthew 5:14 as the Light of the World.